Urga is a village in the municipality of Cazin, Bosnia and Herzegovina.

Demographics 
According to the 2013 census, its population was 1,772.

References

Populated places in Cazin